Hans Dorrestijn (born 16 June 1940 in Ede, Gelderland) is a Dutch comedian and writer.

Programs 
 Bofkont (1973)
 Mooi van lelijkheid (1977)
 In staat van ontbinding (1980)
 Dorrestijns geweten spreekt (1982)
 Circus Horlepiep (1985, with Lévi Weemoedt)
 Liederen van wanhoop en ongeloof (1987)
 Liederen van wanhoop en ongeloof II (1989)
 Pretpark (1991)
 Na regen komt Dorrestijn (1993)
 Gesmolten ijsberen (1995)
 Dorrestijn viert oud en nieuw (1996)
 Onvervuld verlangen – Dorrestijn viert oud en nieuw (1998)
 Cirkels (2000, with Martin van Dijk)
 Het naakte bestaan (2005, with Martin van Dijk)
 Ruïnes (2006, with Martin van Dijk)
 Buigen (2010)
 Goeie genade (2013-2015)
 Baardmannetjes (2014, with Nico de Haan)
 Eindelijk Licht (2014, with Zazí)
 Het einde is zoek (2015-2016)

Filmography 
 J.J. de Bom voorheen: 'De kindervriend' (1979) (writer)
 Sesamstraat (1976) (writer)
 De Stratemakeropzeeshow (1972) (writer)
 De Vliegende Hollander (1995) (dialogue advisor) (song advisor)

External links
 hansdorrestijn.nl (in Dutch)

 

1940 births
Living people
Dutch male comedians
Dutch cabaret performers
People from Ede, Netherlands